Nelson Rodrigo Pizarro Donoso (born 30 January 1970) is a Chilean former professional footballer who played as a forward for clubs in Chile, Germany and Venezuela.

Club career
A product of Universidad Católica youth system, in Chilean Primera División he also played for Cobresal (1992), Deportes La Serena (1993), Palestino (1994–95), Deportes Concepción (1996) and Huachipato (1997).

In 1998 he moved to Germany and joined Fortuna Düsseldorf in the 2. Bundesliga, managed by Klaus Allofs. He made 22 appearances in the 1998–99 season and two appearances in the DFB-pokal, scoring 2 two goals in the last.

Then, he moved to Venezuela and played for Deportivo Italchacao in the 2000 Torneo Clausura.

International career
Pizarro represented Chile at under-20 level in the 1988 South American Championship

Personal life
After his retirement, he graduated as a lawyer.

Honours
Universidad Católica
 Copa Chile: 1991

References

External links
 
 
 Nelson Pizarro at Oocities.org 

1970 births
Living people
Footballers from Santiago
Chilean footballers
Chilean expatriate footballers
Chile under-20 international footballers
Club Deportivo Universidad Católica footballers
Cobresal footballers
Deportes La Serena footballers
Club Deportivo Palestino footballers
Deportes Concepción (Chile) footballers
C.D. Huachipato footballers
Fortuna Düsseldorf players
Deportivo Miranda F.C. players
Chilean Primera División players
2. Bundesliga players
Venezuelan Primera División players
Chilean expatriate sportspeople in Germany
Chilean expatriate sportspeople in Venezuela
Expatriate footballers in Germany
Expatriate footballers in Venezuela
Association football forwards
Chilean lawyers
21st-century Chilean lawyers